Mountain House, California may refer to:

Mountain House, Alameda County, California
Mountain House, Butte County, California, now Brush Creek
Mountain House, Kern County, California
Mountain House, San Joaquin County, California